"Make It to Heaven" is a song by French DJ David Guetta, Danish DJ and producer Morten and British singer-songwriter Raye. It was released as a single on 22 November 2019 by What a Music.

Track listing

Personnel
Credits adapted from Tidal.
 David Guetta – producer, composer, writer
 Mike Hawkins – producer, composer, masterer, mixer, writer
 Morten Breum – producer, composer, DJ, writer
 Toby Green – producer, composer, masterer, mixer, writer
 Rachel Keen – composer, writer
 Raye – additional producer, featured artist
 Jenna Felsenthal – vocal engineer

Charts

References

2019 songs
2019 singles
David Guetta songs
Raye (singer) songs
Song recordings produced by David Guetta